A special election for Florida's 13th congressional district was held March 11, 2014, to elect a member of the United States House of Representatives, following the death of incumbent Republican Congressman Bill Young on October 18, 2013. Primary elections were held on January 14, 2014. Young, who had already announced that he would not be running for re-election in 2014, was re-elected in 2012 with 57 percent of the vote. With 100% of the precincts reporting, David Jolly was declared the winner of the special election.

Background
On October 9, 2013, Republican Bill Young, who had held this Tampa Bay-area district since 1971, announced that he would not run for re-election to a twenty-second term in 2014. He died 9 days later and this special election was called to fill his seat. Though Young had been re-elected by wide margins, the district in recent years had become competitive. In the four most recent presidential elections, it was won by Al Gore over George W. Bush in 2000 51%-49%, by Bush with 51%-49% in 2004, by Barack Obama over John McCain 51%-47% and again carried by Obama in 2012 by a narrower 50%-49% over Mitt Romney. Given this, some political commentators and journalists viewed this election as a bellwether  for the fall 2014 elections.
While discounting the idea of special elections as bellwethers, political scientists' agreed the result was a data point that public sentiment favored Republicans.

Republican primary

Candidates

Declared
 Mark Bircher, retired United States Marine Corps Brigadier General
 David Jolly, attorney and former general counsel to Bill Young
 Kathleen Peters, state representative

Declined
 Larry Ahern, state representative
 Joseph Ayoub, Mayor of Safety Harbor
 Rick Baker, former mayor of St. Petersburg
 Neil Brickfield, former Pinellas County Commissioner
 George Cretekos, Mayor of Clearwater
 Larry Crow, former state representative
 Bob Gualtieri, Pinellas County sheriff
 Frank Hibbard, former mayor of Clearwater
 Michael Pinson, publisher
 Karen Seel, Pinellas County Commissioner
 Beverly Young, widow of Bill Young
 Bill "Billy" Young II, son of Bill Young
 Tom Young, brother of Bill Young
 Nick Zoller, Republican consultant and strategist

Endorsements

Polling

Results

Democratic nomination

Candidates

Nominee
 Alex Sink, former Chief Financial Officer of Florida and nominee for Governor of Florida in 2010

Withdrew
 Jessica Ehrlich, attorney and nominee for the 13th congressional district in 2012

Declined
 Janet C. Long, Pinellas County Commissioner
 Charlie Justice, Pinellas County Commissioner and nominee for Florida's 10th congressional district in 2010

Endorsements

Polling

General election

Candidates
 David Jolly (Republican), attorney and former general counsel to Bill Young
 Michael S. Levinson (write-in)
 Lucas Overby (Libertarian), commercial diver and activist
 Alex Sink (Democratic), former Chief Financial Officer of Florida and nominee for Governor of Florida in 2010

One voter was confused by a website called "sinkforcongress2014" accepting donations to the National Republican Congressional Committee to defeat Sink and other Democrats, thinking it was a pro-Sink website. His $250 donation was refunded by the NRCC.

Debates
David Jolly, Lucas Overby, and Alex Sink, the three candidates appearing on the ballot for the special election, took part in a televised debate on February 3, 2014. Held at the Seminole Campus of St. Petersburg College and co-hosted by the Tampa Bay Times and Bay News 9, the event aired live on C-SPAN 3. Al Ruechel, Adam Smith, and Amy Hollyfield served as moderators. The debate can be viewed in its entirety here. 

A non-scientific poll conducted after the debate by Bay News 9 indicated that overall viewers felt David Jolly had won with 37% of the vote, followed by Alex Sink with 33% and Lucas Overby with 30%.

Campaign spending
During the campaign, OpenSecrets reported on February 13, 2014, that outside groups had spent $3.5 million on the election, with $2.6 million of that from groups that support Jolly. This makes it the most expensive election of the 2014 cycle so far and one of the most expensive special congressional elections in history.

The Associated Press reports that $11 million total was spent as the Democratic Party poured money into the campaign in its final weeks.  In the end, Sink outspent Jolly by 3 to 1 on television ads as well as outspending him overall.

Endorsements

Polling

Results

References

External links
 Mark Bircher
 David Jolly
 Michael S. Levinson
 Lucas Overby
 Kathleen Peters
 Alex Sink
 Nick Zoller

Florida 2014 13
Florida 2014 13
2014 13 Special
Florida 13 Special
United States House of Representatives 13 Special
United States House of Representatives 2014 13
March 2014 events in the United States